Xhavit Bajrami (born October 30, 1975) is an Albanian-Swiss former kickboxer who competed in the heavyweight division. A Seido karate practitioner and Andy Hug student, Bajrami built up an undefeated record domestically before he was recruited by K-1 where he won the K-1 Braves '99 tournament and finished as runner-up in two other tournaments. He is also a two-time Muay Thai world champion, having won the ISKA World Super Heavyweight title in 2004 and the WKN World Super Heavyweight strap in 2010.

Early life
A Kosovar Albanian, Bajrami was born in Dumosh, SFR Yugoslavia (now Kosovo) in 1975. He relocated to Switzerland where he began practicing Seido karate and eventually kickboxing.

Career

K-1 career (1998–2004)
Bajrami transitioned from full contact karate to kickboxing under the tutelage of fellow karateka-turned-kickboxers Andy Hug and Michael Thompson, and amassed an undefeated record fighting domestically before being recruited by the world's premier kickboxing promotion, K-1 in 1998. In his promotional debut, Bajrami entered into a one night, eight-man tournament held on May 6, 1998 at K-1 Fight Night '98 in Zurich. He needed an extension round to get past Matteo Minonzie in the quarter-finals, and was then eliminated from the tournament in the semis when his bout with Rob van Esdonk was stopped by the doctor in the first round. The stoppage was controversial as Bajrami claimed to have been hit by an illegal elbow from van Esdonk and refused to return to his feet, prompting the doctor to deem him unable to fight. He was back in action just over a month later when he fought to a five-round draw with Kirkwood Walker at K-1 Dream '98 in Nagoya, Japan on July 17, 1998.

Beginning his 1999 campaign on May 5 at K-1 Fight Night '99 in Zurich, Bajrami went up against Carl Bernardo, brother of the great Mike Bernardo, and stopped the South African with a kick in round one. Just fifteen days later in Fukuoka, Japan, Bajrami was among the eight fighters battling it out to win the tournament at K-1 Braves '99. He defeated Siniša Andrijašević by technical knockout in the quarter-finals when his opponent was not allowed continue on the advice of the doctor, and then faced Mirko Cro Cop at the semi-final stage. The bout was ruled a draw at the end of the regulation three rounds and so an extension round was added to decide the winner, after which Bajrami was given the nod by all three judges. Advancing to the finals, he faced another close fight against Lloyd van Dams but took a unanimous decision after an extra round once again to win the tournament and qualify for the 1999 K-1 World Grand Prix, the gathering of the world's sixteen best heavyweights. At the K-1 World Grand Prix '99 Opening Round in Osaka, Japan on October 5, 1999, Bajrami had his first of three meetings with Dutch legend Ernesto Hoost, losing by unanimous decision.

After going 1-1 in the first half of the year with a decision loss to Stefan Leko at K-1 The Millennium in Osaka on April 23, 2000 and a points win over Samir Benazzouz at K-1 Fight Night 2000 in Zurich on June 3, 2000, Bajrami was invited to compete in the K-1 Grand Prix Europe 2000 in Zagreb, Croatia on September 1, 2000. He was able to go past Belgian duo Peter Bamoshi and Marc de Wit, respectively, before being stopped with a devastating high kick by Jörgen Kruth in the final. Following the sudden passing of his trainer Andy Hug in August 2000, Bajrami relocated to the Netherlands to train under Peter Aerts and Rene Rooze at Chakuriki Gym. During his time training at Chakuriki, his karate-based style shifted to take on numerous Muay Thai techniques.

On March 3, 2001, he lost another decision to Ernesto Hoost at 2 Hot 2 Handle: Simply the Best in Amsterdam, Netherlands. Then, in another rematch, he bested Samir Benazzouz by decision for the second time at the K-1 World Grand Prix 2001 in Nagoya on July 20, 2001.

2002 was a quiet year for Bajrami as he competed just once under the K-1 banner, albeit taking three fights in one night at the K-1 World Grand Prix 2002 Preliminary Croatia on April 13 in Zagreb. After TKOing Dragan Jovanović at the quarter-final stage, he took a unanimous points victory over Siniša Pulyak in the semis. Going up against fellow Swiss-based karateka Petar Majstorović in the tournament final, Bajrami lost by decision after an extra round was needed to separate the pair.

Bajrami returned to tournament action on May 30, 2003 at the K-1 World Grand Prix 2003 in Basel. He avenged his loss to Jörgen Kruth by taking an extension round split decision over the Swede at the first round but was then eliminated by the eventual tournament winner Jerrel Venetiaan in the semis. He bounced back with a decision win over familiar foe Siniša Pulyak in Croatia on September 12, 2003.

On March 6, 2004, Bajrami was crowned the ISKA World Super Heavyweight (+96.4 kg/212 lb) Muay Thai Champion when he beat Australia's Peter Graham by decision in his birth city of Pristina, Kosovo. Returning to Japan for the first time in almost three years, Bajrami lost to Ernesto Hoost on points for the third time at the K-1 World Grand Prix 2004 in Saitama just twenty-one days later. Then, in what would be his last ever match in K-1, Bajrami took a unanimous decision victory over Martin Holm at the K-1 World Grand Prix 2004 in Nagoya on June 6, 2004.

Post K-1 (2005–2012)
Despite racking up thirteen victories in K-1, Bajrami's run in the promotion came to an end in 2004. On September 18, 2004, he lost to Vitali Akhramenko via decision after five rounds of fighting in Basel, Switzerland. He then went 1-1 in 2005 with a split decision win over James Phillips and a loss at the hands of Karl Glyschinsky.

Bajrami dropped a decision to Polish-Australian Muay Thai stylist Paul Slowinski in Switzerland on May 26, 2006, but followed it up with a third-round KO win over Tumelo Maphutha in South Africa five months later to set up a rematch with Slowinski on November 11, 2006 in Macau with the vacant WMC World Super Heavyweight (+95 kg/209.4 lb) Championship on the line this time. After a gruelling five round battle in which Bajrami sustained multiple gashes to the head, Slowinski was awarded the decision and walked away with the belt.

2007 was another mixed year for him. He knocked out Alessandro D'Ambrossio in the first round at the Night of Fighters 4 event in Bern, Switzerland but then dropped a decision to giant Russian Alexander Ustinov in Moscow a month later.

Bajrami fought Petar Majstorović for the second time on February 9, 2008 in Switzerland and got his own back on the Croatian, winning the decision after three rounds. He then TKO'd Dániel Török in November of that year in Sursee, Switzerland before finishing American Mike Shepherd with a highlight reel high kick on June 27, 2009 in the same city. He ended the year with a controversial defence of his ISKA world title on November 21, 2009 in Pristina, Kosovo against fellow K-1 veteran Freddy Kemayo. Kemayo was docked a point in the fourth round for a headbutt, and the judges scored the bout a split draw (50-48, 46-47, 48-48) after the final bell.

On December 18, 2010, Bajrami became a world champion for the second time with a third round low kick stoppage of Dawid Trólka in Zurich to take the WKN World Super Heavyweight (+96.6 kg/213 lb) Muay Thai belt.

In what is generally considered to be a biased hometown decision, Bajrami defended his ISKA strap against Indian challenger Singh Jaideep in Lucerne on July 2, 2011. He was floored by Jaideep in round one but received a long count and was able to recover.

He was then expected to make a return to K-1 and fight Daniel Ghiţă at the K-1 World Grand Prix 2011 in Nanjing Final 16 on October 29, 2011. However, the event was cancelled due to the promotion experiencing severe financial problems.

Bajrami made the third defence of his ISKA world title by knocking out Takenori Onda with a high kick in the fourth round of their contest in Lucerne on June 2, 2012. Since 2015 he is in a relationship with Rudina Magjistari.

Championships and awards

Kickboxing
K-1
K-1 Braves '99 Tournament Championship
K-1 Grand Prix Europe 2000 Runner-up
K-1 World Grand Prix 2002 Preliminary Croatia Runner-up
International Sport Karate Association
ISKA World Super Heavyweight (+96.4 kg/212 lb) Muay Thai Championship
World Kickboxing Network
WKN World Super Heavyweight (+96.6 kg/213 lb) Muay Thai Championship
World Independent Promoters Union
W.I.P.U. 'King of the Ring' World Super Heavyweight Championship
World Kickboxing Association
W.K.A. European Super Heavyweight Thai-boxing Championship

Boxing record

|-
|-  bgcolor="#CCFFCC"
|2009-10-03||Win||align=left| Sandor Balogh||||Emmenbrücke, Switzerland||Decision (unanimous)||6||3:00||3-0
|-
|-  bgcolor="#CCFFCC"
|2009-03-14||Win||align=left| Alexandru Manea||||Zurich, Switzerland||Decision (unanimous)||6|| 3:00||2-0
|-
|-  bgcolor="#CCFFCC"
|2001-09-25||Win||align=left| Samson Mahlangu||||Cape Town, South Africa||Decision||4||3:00||1-0
|-
|-
| colspan=9 | Legend:

Kickboxing record

|-
|-  bgcolor="#CCFFCC"
|2012-06-02||Win||align=left| Takenori Onda||||Lucerne, Switzerland||KO (left high kick)||4|| 
|-
!style=background:white colspan=9|
|-
|-  bgcolor="#CCFFCC"
|2011-07-02||Win||align=left| Singh Jaideep||K-1 MAX Switzerland||Lucerne, Switzerland|| Decision||5||3:00
|-
!style=background:white colspan=9|
|-
|-  bgcolor="#CCFFCC"
|2010-12-18||Win||align=left| Dawid Trólka||||Zurich, Switzerland||KO (right low kick)||3|| 
|-
!style=background:white colspan=9|
|-
|- style="background:#c5d2ea;"
|2009-11-21||Draw||align=left| Freddy Kemayo||K-1 Gladiators||Pristina, Kosovo||Draw||5||3:00
|-
!style=background:white colspan=9|
|-
|-  bgcolor="#CCFFCC"
|2009-06-27||Win||align=left| Mike Shepherd||K-1 Fight Night: ISKA World Championship||Sursee, Switzerland||KO (right high kick)||1|| 
|-
|-  bgcolor="#CCFFCC"
|2008-10-00||Win||align=left| Dániel Török||K-1 Rules Fight Night 2008||Sursee, Switzerland||TKO|||| 
|-
|-  bgcolor="#CCFFCC"
|2008-02-09||Win||align=left| Petar Majstorović||||Switzerland||Decision (unanimous)||3||3:00
|-
|-  bgcolor="#FFBBBB"
|2007-11-30||Loss||align=left| Alexander Ustinov||Battle of Champions||Moscow, Russia||Decision||3||3:00
|-
|-  bgcolor="#CCFFCC"
|2007-10-27||Win||align=left| Alessandro D'Ambrossio||Night of Fighters 4||Bern, Switzerland||KO||1||2:32
|-
|-  bgcolor="#FFBBBB"
|2006-11-11||Loss||align=left| Paul Slowinski||Xplosion||Macau||Decision||5||3:00
|-
!style=background:white colspan=9|
|-
|-  bgcolor="#CCFFCC"
|2006-10-14||Win||align=left| Tumelo Maphutha||Africa Bom-Ba-Ye||South Africa||KO (right low kick and punches)||3|| 
|-
|-  bgcolor="#FFBBBB"
|2006-05-26||Loss||align=left| Paul Slowinski||||Switzerland||Decision||||
|-
|-  bgcolor="#FFBBBB"
|2005||Loss||align=left| Karl Glyschinsky|||||||||| 
|-
|-  bgcolor="#CCFFCC"
|2005-05-07||Win||align=left| James Phillips||Kickboxgala in Bern||Bern, Switzerland||Decision (split)||3||3:00
|-
|-  bgcolor="#FFBBBB"
|2004-09-18||Loss||align=left| Vitali Akhramenko||K-1 WKA Championships||Basel, Switzerland|| Decision (unanimous)||5||3:00
|-
|-  bgcolor="#CCFFCC"
|2004-06-06||Win||align=left| Martin Holm||K-1 World Grand Prix 2004 in Nagoya||Nagoya, Japan||Decision (unanimous)||3||3:00
|-
|-  bgcolor="#FFBBBB"
|2004-03-27||Loss||align=left|Ernesto Hoost||K-1 World Grand Prix 2004 in Saitama||Saitama, Japan||Decision (unanimous)||3||3:00
|-
|-  bgcolor="#CCFFCC"
|2004-03-06||Win||align=left| Peter Graham||Kings of the Ring||Pristina, Kosovo||Decision||5||3:00
|-
!style=background:white colspan=9|
|-
|-  bgcolor="#CCFFCC"
|2003-09-12||Win||align=left| Siniša Pulyak||K-1 Final Fight||Croatia||Decision|||| 
|-
|-  bgcolor="#FFBBBB"
|2003-05-30||Loss||align=left| Jerrel Venetiaan||K-1 World Grand Prix 2003 in Basel, Semi Finals||Basel, Switzerland||Extension round decision||4||3:00
|-
|-  bgcolor="#CCFFCC"
|2003-05-30||Win||align=left| Jörgen Kruth||K-1 World Grand Prix 2003 in Basel, Quarter Finals || Basel, Switzerland||Extension round decision (split)||4||3:00
|-
|-  bgcolor="#FFBBBB"
|2002-04-13||Loss||align=left| Petar Majstorović||K-1 World Grand Prix 2002 Preliminary Croatia, Final||Zagreb, Croatia||Extension round decision (unanimous)||4||3:00
|-
!style=background:white colspan=9|
|-
|-  bgcolor="#CCFFCC"
|2002-04-13||Win||align=left| Siniša Pulyak||K-1 World Grand Prix 2002 Preliminary Croatia, Semi Finals ||Zagreb, Croatia||Decision (unanimous)||3||3:00
|-
|-  bgcolor="#CCFFCC"
|2002-04-13||Win||align=left| Dragan Jovanović||K-1 World Grand Prix 2002 Preliminary Croatia, Quarter Finals||Zagreb, Croatia||TKO||3||
|-
|-  bgcolor="#CCFFCC"
|2001-07-20||Win||align=left| Samir Benazzouz||K-1 World Grand Prix 2001 in Nagoya||Nagoya, Japan||Extension round decision (unanimous)||4||3:00
|-
|-  bgcolor="#FFBBBB"
|2001-03-18||Loss||align=left| Ernesto Hoost||2 Hot 2 Handle: Simply the Best||Amsterdam, Netherlands||Decision||5||3:00
|-
|-  bgcolor="#FFBBBB"
|2000-09-01||Loss||align=left| Jörgen Kruth||K-1 Grand Prix Europe 2000, Final||Zagreb, Croatia||KO (high kick)||3|| 
|-
!style=background:white colspan=9|
|-
|-  bgcolor="#CCFFCC"
|2000-09-01||Win||align=left| Marc de Wit||K-1 Grand Prix Europe 2000, Semi Finals||Zagreb, Croatia||Decision||3||3:00
|-
|-  bgcolor="#CCFFCC"
|2000-09-01||Win||align=left| Peter Bamoshi||K-1 Grand Prix Europe 2000, Quarter Finals||Zagreb, Croatia||KO (kick)||1|| 
|-
|-  bgcolor="#CCFFCC"
|2000-06-03||Win||align=left| Samir Benazzouz||K-1 Fight Night 2000||Zurich, Switzerland|| Decision (unanimous)||5||3:00
|-
|-  bgcolor="#FFBBBB"
|2000-04-23||Loss||align=left| Stefan Leko||K-1 The Millennium||Osaka, Japan||Decision (unanimous)||3||3:00
|-
|-  bgcolor="#FFBBBB"
|1999-10-05||Loss||align=left| Ernesto Hoost||K-1 World Grand Prix '99 Opening Round, First Round ||Osaka, Japan||Decision (unanimous)||5||3:00
|-
|-  bgcolor="#CCFFCC"
|1999-06-20||Win||align=left| Lloyd van Dams||K-1 Braves '99, Final||Fukuoka, Japan||Extension round decision (unanimous)||4||3:00
|-
!style=background:white colspan=9 |
|-
|-  bgcolor="#CCFFCC"
|1999-06-20||Win||align=left| Mirko Cro Cop||K-1 Braves '99, Semi Finals||Fukuoka, Japan||Extension round decision (unanimous)||4||3:00
|-
|-  bgcolor="#CCFFCC"
|1999-06-20||Win||align=left| Siniša Andrijašević||K-1 Braves '99, Quarter Finals||Fukuoka, Japan||TKO (doctor stoppage)||3||2:32
|-
|-  bgcolor="#CCFFCC"
|1999-06-05||Win||align=left| Carl Bernardo||K-1 Fight Night '99||Zurich, Switzerland||KO (kick)||1||1:57
|-
|- style="background:#c5d2ea;"
|1998-07-17||Draw||align=left| Kirkwood Walker||K-1 Dream '98||Nagoya, Japan||Draw||5||3:00
|-
|-  bgcolor="#FFBBBB"
|1998-06-06||Loss||align=left| Rob van Esdonk||K-1 Fight Night '98, Semi Finals||Zurich, Switzerland||TKO (doctor stoppage)||1||2:49
|-
|-  bgcolor="#CCFFCC"
|1998-06-06||Win||align=left| Matteo Minonzie||K-1 Fight Night '98, Quarter Finals||Zurich, Switzerland||Extension round decision||4||3:00
|-
|-
| colspan=9 | Legend:

Notes

External links
K-1Sport profile

References

1975 births
Living people
Sportspeople from Pristina
Kosovo Albanians
Kosovan male boxers
Heavyweight boxers
Kosovan male kickboxers
Swiss male kickboxers
Heavyweight kickboxers
Swiss male karateka
Swiss Muay Thai practitioners
Seidokaikan practitioners
Swiss people of Albanian descent
Swiss people of Kosovan descent
Kosovan emigrants to Switzerland
Kosovan expatriates in the Netherlands
Swiss expatriates in the Netherlands
People from the canton of Lucerne
Swiss male boxers